Broken Hymns, Limbs and Skin is the third album by gothic country band O'Death.

Track listing

Personnel
Greg Jamie - vocals, guitar
Gabe Darling - backing vocals, ukulele, guitar, banjo
David Rogers-Berry - drums, whoop
Bob Pycior - fiddle, guitar
Jesse Newman - bass
Dan Sager

Notes

The track "Fire on Peshtigo" refers to the Peshtigo Fire of 1871.

References

2008 albums
O'Death albums